A yole is a clinker built boat that was used for fishing particularly in the north of Scotland. The best known of these is the Orkney Yole. They were rigged for sail or used as rowing boats. The yole is a Nordic design and closely related in shape to the Shetland Yoal and Sgoth Niseach of the Outer Hebrides.

See also
 Orkney Heritage Society

External links
Orkney Yole Association website

Sailboat types
Types of fishing vessels
Orcadian culture
Scottish design
Fishing in Scotland
Rowing boats